are traditional Japanese decorations made for the New Year's. They are a type of yorishiro, or objects intended to welcome ancestral spirits or kami of the harvest. Kadomatsu are usually placed in pairs in front of homes and buildings.

Construction and placement
Historically, kadomatsu was often made with pine wood, but these days bamboo is more common. The central portion of the kadomatsu is formed from three large bamboos, though plastic kadomatsu are available.  After binding all the elements of the kadomatsu, it is bound with a straw mat and newly woven straw rope. Kadomatsu are placed in pairs on either side of the gate, representing male and female.

Usage 
In modern times, kadomatsu are placed after Christmas until January 7 (or January 15 during the Edo period) and are considered temporary housing (shintai) for kami. Designs for kadomatsu vary depending on region but are typically made of pine, bamboo, and sometimes ume tree sprigs which represent longevity, prosperity and steadfastness, respectively. "The fundamental function of the New Year ceremonies is to honor and receive the toshigami (deity), who will then bring a bountiful harvest for farmers and bestow the ancestors' blessing on everyone." After January 15 (or in many instances the 19th) the kadomatsu is burned to appease the kami or toshigami and release them.

Other information 

Gallery

See also
 Christmas tree
 Christmas wreath
 Corn dolly
 Mistletoe
 New Year tree
 Three Friends of Winter
 Trees in mythology

References
2. The Hawaii Herald

External links 

Articles containing video clips
New Year in Japan
Shinto